The 2016 Stock Car Brasil Championship is the thirty-eighth season of the Stock Car Brasil. The season began at Curitiba on March 6 and finished at Interlagos on December 11.

From this season, the league won the seal of Codasur (Automobile Confederation of South America) and will be called the Brazilian Championship and South American Stock Car.

General Motors do Brasil announced the replacement of the Chevrolet Sonic for the New Chevrolet Cruze second generation as the official car of the category teams for the season of 2016 Brazilian and South American Stock Car. The car debut in second round at Velopark

Teams and drivers

Team changes
After a difficult year in 2015, ProGP entered in 2016 as customer team of Full Time Sports, was renamed to Full Time-ProGP and returned to operate two cars.
After four years of partnership, Mico's Racing lost the sponsorship of Prati-Donaduzzi and returned to his official name.
Since 2012 Mobil Super had sponsored AMG Motorsport; in 2016 it sponsors Full Time Sports. The team is now called TMG Motorsport with the acquisition of 100% of corporate shares by Thiago Meneghel.
 Carlos Alves keeps up the sponsorship of Brazil Kirin; the car and team name changed from Schin to Eisenbahn.
 Boettger Competições which in 2003 had a champion with David Muffato left the championship.
 Reigning Champion Voxx Racing changes its name to Cimed Racing, the action is part of the celebrations of 40 years of Cimed Group, team owner and main sponsor since the creation of the team in 2013.

Driver changes

Changed teams
In 2016 Néstor Girolami drove for the Eisenbahn Racing Team and is the first Argentine to compete in the Stock Car the full season and second foreigner to compete in container, the first was the Portuguese Pedro Queiroz Pereira in the seasons 1981 and 1982.
 After seven seasons Atila Abreu left AMG Motorsport and joined Shell Racing.
Felipe Lapenna returned for Hot Car Competições after one year in Schin Racing Team.
With the withdrawal of sponsorship of Prati-Donaduzzi of Mico's Racing, Júlio Campos left the team and will compete for your own team C2.
Vítor Genz left the Boettger Competições and joined Eisenbahn Racing Team.
Diego Nunes left Vogel Motorsport and returns the União Química Bassani Racing in 2016 for which he raced in 2010, 2011 and 2013.
Sergio Jimenez left the C2 Team and joined Cavaleirop Racing.
Rafael Suzuki switched from RZ Motorsport to Vogel Motorsport.
Gustavo Lima who raced for ProGP part-time in 2015 switched to TMG Motorsport.
Lucas Foresti and Felipe Guimarães who raced for AMG Motorsport and Boettger Competições in 2015 are driving for Full Time-ProGP in 2016.

Entering/re-entering the series
After five seasons, Thiago Marques returned for the series with RZ Motorsport.
Alceu Feldmann and Fábio Carbone competed only on first round in 2015, who raced for Mico's Racing in 2016.

Race calendar and results
The 2016 schedule was announced on 3 December 2015. The eighth edition of the Corrida do Milhão was held on September 11 at Interlagos. Like last year, the season was contested over twenty-one races at twelve rounds, with the first round being contested by two-driver entries with wildcard drivers. The race with wildcard drivers – the so-called "All Star Race" – was held at Curitiba. The series did not return to the Ribeirão Preto and Campo Grande, but returned to Londrina. Also the series debuted at a new track in Curvelo, called the Circuito dos Cristais. All races were held in Brazil.

Championship standings
Points system
Points are awarded for each race at an event to the driver/s of a car that completed at least 75% of the race distance and was running at the completion of the race, up to a maximum of 60 points per event.

Dual Race: Used for the first round with Wildcard drivers.
Feature races: Used for the first race of each event and the Stock Car Million race.
Sprint races: Used for the second race of each event, with partially reversed (top ten) grid.
Final race: Used for the last round of the season with double points.

Drivers' Championship

 * –Inegible to score points in first round.

References

External links
  

Stock Car Brasil seasons
Stock Car Brasil season